Louise Hires a Contract Killer is a 2008 French comedy film written and directed by Gustave de Kervern and Benoît Delépine. The film won the Prix Jacques Prévert du Scénario for Best Original Screenplay in 2009.

Cast 
 Yolande Moreau as Louise Ferrand
 Bouli Lanners as Michel Pinchon
 Benoît Poelvoorde as Guy
 Albert Dupontel as Miro
 Miss Ming as Jennifer
 Catherine Hosmalin as Madame Pinchon
 Francis Kuntz as Frambard
 Philippe Katerine as The singer

Critical reception
The film was well received by the critics. Review aggregator Rotten Tomatoes reports that 81% of 16 critics gave the film a positive review, for an average rating of 6.4/10.

References

External links 

2008 films
2008 comedy films
French comedy films
2000s French-language films
Films directed by Gustave Kervern
Films directed by Benoît Delépine
2000s French films